Paul Preuss (born March 7, 1942 in Albany, Georgia) is an American writer of science fiction and science articles, who also works as a science consultant for film companies. He is the author of numerous stand-alone novels as well as novels in Arthur C. Clarke's Venus Prime series, based upon incidents, characters, and places from Clarke's short stories.

Preuss was a consulting editor for the six-book Dr. Bones series (1988-1989) published by Ace Books.

Personal life 
Preuss was born in Albany, Georgia. His father, who worked in the Air Force was stationed at Turner Field. In the first few years of his life Paul had lived in Georgia, Texas, New Mexico, Hawaii and Virginia. 
The Preuss' settled down in Albuquerque. Paul's father began working at Sandia Base testing nuclear bombs. The scientists Paul met during these formative years were an influence on the types of characters he would write about 40 years later.
Paul went to school at Yale, where he met and befriended Sidney Mintz as well as Jean Rouch.

Bibliography

Standalone Novels

Series

Peter Slater

Arthur C. Clarke's Venus Prime

Short fiction

References

External links
 
 
 

20th-century American novelists
American male novelists
American science fiction writers
Novelists from Georgia (U.S. state)
People from Albany, Georgia
1942 births
Living people
20th-century American male writers